Potassium/sodium hyperpolarization-activated cyclic nucleotide-gated channel 3 is a protein that in humans is encoded by the HCN3 gene.

See also
 Cyclic nucleotide-gated ion channel

References

Further reading

External links 
 

Ion channels